Yayuk Basuki was the defending champion but lost in the semifinals to Irina Spîrlea.

Sabine Hack won in the final 2–6, 7–6, 6–4 against Spîrlea.

Seeds
A champion seed is indicated in bold text while text in italics indicates the round in which that seed was eliminated. The top eight seeds received a bye to the second round.

  Sabine Hack (champion)
  Yayuk Basuki (semifinals)
  Ann Grossman (second round)
  Florencia Labat (third round)
  Shi-Ting Wang (quarterfinals)
  Irina Spîrlea (final)
  Nana Miyagi (quarterfinals)
  Elena Pampoulova (second round)
 n/a
  Alexandra Fusai (second round)
  Stephanie Rottier (third round)
  Petra Begerow (first round)
  Karin Kschwendt (third round)
  Sung-Hee Park (second round)
  Laurence Courtois (first round)
  Noëlle van Lottum (second round)

Draw

Finals

Top half

Section 1

Section 2

Bottom half

Section 3

Section 4

References
 1995 Danamon Open Draw

Danamon Open
1995 WTA Tour